The Netherlands Antilles competed at the 1992 Summer Olympics in Barcelona, Spain.

Competitors
The following is the list of number of competitors in the Games.

Results by event

Athletics
Men's 110m Hurdles
 James Sharpe 
 Heats — 14.49 (→ did not advance)

Sailing
Men's Sailboard (Lechner A-390)
Constantino Saragoza
 Final Ranking — 368.0 points (→ 38th place)

Women's Sailboard (Lechner A-390)
Bep de Waard
 Final Ranking — 226.0 points (→ 22nd place)

See also
Netherlands Antilles at the 1991 Pan American Games

References

Sources
Official Olympic Reports

Nations at the 1992 Summer Olympics
1992
Olympics